War and Peace Studies was a project carried out by the Council on Foreign Relations between 1939 and 1945 before and during American involvement in World War II.  It was intended to advise the U.S. Government on conduct in the war and the subsequent peace.

The project was divided into four major areas:  economic and financial, security and armaments, territorial, and political.  Over 100 men took part. Funding was provided by the Rockefeller Foundation, which provided almost $350,000 over the course of the project.  A steering committee was created in December 1939 chaired by U.S diplomat Norman Davis with Foreign Affairs editor Hamilton Fish Armstrong as vice-chairman.  Initial area heads were:

Alvin Hansen and Jacob Viner led the economic and financial group
Whitney Shepardson, who led the political group
Allen Welsh Dulles and Hanson W. Baldwin, who led the armaments group, and
Isaiah Bowman, who led the territorial group.

A research secretary was appointed to each group:
William Diebold, for the economic and financial group
Walter R. Sharp, for the political group, and
Grayson L. Kirk, for the armaments group
William P. Maddox, for the territorial group

From March 1942, the project supplied research secretaries to the State Department's Advisory Committee on Postwar Foreign Policy, with each group's secretary serving the corresponding subcommittee at the State Department.  Meetings were scheduled to allow secretaries to carry out Council work during the first half of each week with the remainder of the week spent at the Department of State.

References

External links
The Council on Foreign Relations from 1921 to 1996 - War and Peace
 The Council on Foreign Relations and the Grand Area: Case Studies on the Origins of the IMF and the Vietnam War by G. William Domhoff

1939 establishments in the United States
1945 disestablishments in the United States
Agencies of the United States government during World War II
Council on Foreign Relations
Rockefeller Foundation